The 1989 Louisville Cardinals football team represented the University of Louisville in the 1989 NCAA Division I-A football season. The Cardinals, led by fifth-year head coach Howard Schnellenberger, participated as independents and played their home games at Cardinal Stadium.

Schedule

References

Louisville
Louisville Cardinals football seasons
Louisville Cardinals football